Woman of the North Country is a 1952 American Western film directed by Joseph Kane and starring Ruth Hussey, Rod Cameron, John Agar and Gale Storm. The film was released on September 5, 1952, by Republic Pictures.

Plot

Cast     
 Ruth Hussey as Christine Powell
 Rod Cameron as Kyle Ramlo
 John Agar as David Powell
 Gale Storm as Cathy Nordlund
 J. Carrol Naish as John Mulholland
 Jim Davis as Steve Powell
 Jay C. Flippen as Axel Nordlund
 Taylor Holmes as Andrew Dawson
 Barry Kelley as O'Hara
 Grant Withers as Henry S. Chapman
 Stephen Bekassy as Andre Duclos
 Howard Petrie as Rick Barton
 Hank Worden as Tom Gordon
 Virginia Brissac as Mrs. Dawson

References

External links 
 

1952 films
American Western (genre) films
1952 Western (genre) films
Films shot in Minnesota
Republic Pictures films
Films directed by Joseph Kane
1950s English-language films
1950s American films